Gareth Stedman Jones  (born 17 December 1942) is an English academic and historian. As Professor of the History of Ideas at Queen Mary, University of London, he deals particularly with working-class history and Marxism.

Career
Educated at St Paul's School and Lincoln College, Oxford, where he graduated in history in 1964, Stedman Jones went on to Nuffield College, Oxford to take a DPhil in 1970.

He moved to Cambridge in 1974, becoming a fellow of King's College, Cambridge, and in 1979, a lecturer in history. He was a research fellow at Nuffield College, Oxford, from 1967 to 1970, a senior associate member of St Antony's College, Oxford, in 1971–1972, and an Alexander von Humboldt Stiftung Fellow, Department of Philosophy, Goethe University, Frankfurt in 1973–1974, before becoming a lecturer in history at Cambridge in 1979–1986 and a reader in history of social thought there in 1986–1997. He has served as co-director of the Centre for History and Economics at King's since 1991 and held the post of professor of political science since 1997.

From 1964 to 1981 Stedman Jones served on the editorial board of the New Left Review. He was a joint founder of the History Workshop Journal in 1976.

In 2018, reviewing Stedman Jones's intellectual evolution, historian Terence Renaud described a "journey from the New Left, through French structuralism, to a contextualist practice of intellectual history that leaves Marxism behind."

Publications
Outcast London, Oxford, 1971, reprinted 1984 (with new preface), 1992 and 2002
Languages of Class: Studies in English Working Class History, 1832–1982, Cambridge, 1983
Klassen, Politik, Sprache, edited by {Peter Schöttler}, Munster, 1988
Karl Marx and Friedrich Engels, The Communist Manifesto, Harmondsworth, 2002: introduction of 180 pp.
An End to Poverty? London, Profile Books, July 2004
Karl Marx: Greatness and Illusion, published by Allan Lane, August 2016

External links
 Interviewed by Alan Macfarlane 23 April 2012 (video)

References

1942 births
Alumni of Lincoln College, Oxford
Alumni of Nuffield College, Oxford
British Marxist historians
Historians of economic thought
Historians of political thought
Fellows of King's College, Cambridge
Living people
People educated at St Paul's School, London
Members of the University of Cambridge faculty of history
Academics of Queen Mary University of London
Fellows of the British Academy